Ditropis is a genus of land snails with opercula, terrestrial gastropods in the family Cyclophoridae.

There is also a hemipteran genus Ditropis, homonym of Stiroma Fieber 1866 , belonging to the family Delphacidae.

Distribution 
This genus can be found on Java and New Guinea., India and Australia.

Species
The genus Ditropis contains the following species:
 Ditropis biroi
 Ditropis koperbergi
 Ditropis papuana
 Ditropis whitei

References

Cyclophoridae
Taxonomy articles created by Polbot